Wojciech Pszczolarski (born 26 April 1991) is a Polish professional racing cyclist, who currently rides for UCI Continental team . He rode at the 2015 UCI Track Cycling World Championships.

References

External links

1991 births
Living people
Polish male cyclists
Sportspeople from Wrocław
Polish track cyclists
European Championships (multi-sport event) gold medalists
European Games competitors for Poland
Cyclists at the 2019 European Games